A Tyrolean traverse is a method of crossing through free space between two high points on a rope without a hanging cart or cart equivalent. This is used in a range of mountaineering activities: rock climbing, technical tree climbing, caving, water crossings and mountain rescue. A zip-line is in essence a Tyrolean traverse which is traveled down quickly with the assistance of gravity. Several sources claim that the name comes from the Tyrolean Alps, where climbers are said to have developed the system in the late nineteenth and early twentieth centuries.

Description
In rock climbing, a Tyrolean traverse is most often used to return to the main part of a wall after climbing a detached pillar. Lost Arrow Spire, a detached pillar in Yosemite Valley, is often abseiled using a dramatic Tyrolean traverse. There are many ways to anchor the line at the two high points, but the significant feature is that there is a line strung between them.

Many classic locations for Tyrolean traverses have since been used as locations for "highlining" or "slacklining" (techniques which involve walking atop the line as one does a tightrope, rather than hanging beneath) at great heights. In a sense such a walk is a Tyrolean traverse, but since slacklining is a sport or stunt rather than a form of transportation this is not entirely accurate. With the rise in popularity of slacklining and the relative decline in the use of Tyrolean traverse by the climbing community, the terms "highlining" and "Tyrolean traverse" have been somewhat confused because of obvious overlaps in their nature, including preparation and location.

Because Tyrolean traverses, and "highlines", have low tension they may sag significantly between the ends. The result is that they slope downhill at the beginning, and then uphill at some point along the traverse, with the lowest point being determined by the relative heights of each end. Traveling across a Tyrolean traverse can vary from using only one's hands and legs to the use of carabiners or pulleys, together with prusiks or ascenders when "progress capture" is required to prevent the upward slope from causing the traverser to slide back toward the low point. In most modern situations the traverser is secured to the line through some combination of climbing harness, webbing, carabiner, and/or pulleys.

There are situations in which a Tyrolean traverse is a preferred way to descend a route, and a Tyrolean traverse may allow a climber to avoid a long multi-pitch rope rappel in favor of a walk-off (walking descent); or a Tyrolean traverse may allow the climber to avoid an undesirable or dangerous location such as a steep scree field.

Records
The longest Tyrolean traverse accepted by Guinness is 1550 meters. It was created on September 19th, 2008, in Rila mountain range in Bulgaria. Another famous Tyrolean traverse, set up in 2000, connected Castleton Tower and Rectory desert towers, which are about 500 meters apart.

In popular culture
A famous use of a Tyrolean traverse in popular culture was in the opening scene of the 1993 Sylvester Stallone film Cliffhanger, where a mountain rescue climber (played by Stallone) unsuccessfully attempts to transport a woman across a high Tyrolean traverse, only to have her fall to her death. This scene was later spoofed in the Jim Carrey comedy film Ace Ventura: When Nature Calls.

References 

Mountaineering techniques
Climbing techniques
Caving techniques
es:Tirolina